The Chinese Ambassador to Indonesia is the official representative of the People's Republic of China to Indonesia.

List of representatives

Consul general

Ambassadors

See also
China–Indonesia relations

References 

Ambassadors of China to Indonesia
Indonesia
China